Fall Into the Sun is the fourth studio album by American band Swearin'. It was released on October 5, 2018, under Merge Records, and is the band's first album since reforming in 2017.

Release
On July 23, 2018, Swearin' announced the release of the new album, along with the first single "Grow Into a Ghost".

The second single "Untitled (LA)" was released on August 13, 2018, and focuses Crutchfield's life in California.

The third single "Future Hell" was released on September 6, 2018. Kyle Gilbride explained the single is based on "visions of an unseen place and time, learning lessons of disenchantment from a new and hostile world. Finding a way back, friendship and independence reveal marks on the trail."

On October 5, 2018, Swearin' released the music videos for "Grow Into a Ghost" and "Future Hell". The videos were presented in 3D, and directed by Jake Fogelnest.

Tour
On April 18, 2018, the band announced a tour in support of the album for August 2018, with Mike Krol and Ought.

Critical reception
Fall Into the Sun was met with "generally favorable" reviews from critics. At Metacritic, which assigns a weighted average rating out of 100 to reviews from mainstream publications, this release received an average score of 76, based on 9 reviews. Aggregator Album of the Year gave the release a 76 out of 100 based on a critical consensus of 11 reviews.

Joe Goggins from DIY said the album is the "best Swearin' record yet; that Allison and Kyle have not just reformed the band, but actually brought the creative best out of each other in doing so, is a powerful advert for reconciliation". Ian Gormely from Exclaim! mentioned "its sound is more robust, the songs more thoughtful and frankly, more mature," while impressed that it is "their best album to date, Fall Into the Sun is the sound of a band rebuilding itself one song at a time and becoming that much stronger in the process.

Accolades

Track listing

Personnel

Musicians
 Allison Crutchfield – vocals
 Kyle Gilbride – guitar
 Jeff Bolt – drums

Production
 Dave Gardner – mastering
 Alexander Rotondo – photographer

Charts

References

2018 albums
Swearin' albums
Merge Records albums